Derrahs is an unincorporated community in Lewis County, in the U.S. state of Missouri.

History
A post office called Derrahs was established in 1890, and remained in operation until 1904. The community took its name from nearby Derrahs Branch.

References

Unincorporated communities in Lewis County, Missouri
Unincorporated communities in Missouri